

Otto Schury (22 October 1903 – 11 December 1979) was a German general during World War II. He was a recipient of the Knight's Cross of the Iron Cross with Oak Leaves of Nazi Germany.

In February 1945, Schury was appointed commander of the 100th Jäger Division. Promoted to major general (Generalmajor) in April, his command surrendered to the Soviet Army in Silesia the following month and Schury was imprisoned in the Soviet Union. He was released in 1955. and died in 1979.

Awards
 Iron Cross (1939) 2nd Class (20 September 1939) & 1st Class (23 February 1940)
 German Cross in Gold on 10 May 1943 as Oberstleutnant in Jäger-Regiment 229
 Knight's Cross of the Iron Cross with Oak Leaves
 Knight's Cross on 17 July 1941 as Major and commander of the II./Gebirgsjäger-Regiment 100
 Oak Leaves on 21 September 1944 as Oberst and commander of Jäger-Regiment 229

Notes

References

 

 
 
 

1903 births
1979 deaths
Military personnel from Munich
People from the Kingdom of Bavaria
Major generals of the German Army (Wehrmacht)
Recipients of the Gold German Cross
Recipients of the Knight's Cross of the Iron Cross with Oak Leaves
German prisoners of war in World War II held by the Soviet Union
Burials at Munich Waldfriedhof
German Army generals of World War II